The Shakertown Stakes is a Grade III American thoroughbred horse race for horses age three and older over a distance of  furlongs on the turf held annually in early April at Keeneland Race Course in Lexington, Kentucky during the spring meeting. The event currently carries a purse of $350,000.

History

The event was inaugurated as The Mistral Stakes on 18 October 1995 as a three-year-old-only race over a distance of  miles.  The following year the event was not held but in 1997 was moved to the spring meeting and held at the current distance of  furlongs. 

The event was renamed in 1998 to the Shakertown Stakes to honor Shakertown, a nearby Shaker community that is a United States National Historic Landmark, located about 25 miles from the racetrack.

The event was upgraded to a Grade III in 2003 and in 2016 to a Grade II.

In 2020 Lienster broke the course record held by Perfect Officer since 2012. The time was 1:00.86 for the  furlongs sprint.

Records
Speed record
 1:00.86 – Leinster (2020)

Margins
 4 lengths – Bound for Nowhere (2018)

Most wins
 2 – Soaring Free (2004, 2005)
 2 – Bound for Nowhere (2018, 2021)

Most wins by an owner
 2 – Sam-Son Farm (2004, 2005)
 2 – Martin Racing Stable (2008, 2014)
 2 – Wesley A. Ward (2018, 2021)

Most wins by a jockey
 3 – Shane Sellers (1998, 1999, 2004)

Most wins by a trainer
 4 – Wesley A. Ward (2016, 2018, 2021, 2022)

Winners

Notes:

§ Ran as part of an entry

See also 
 List of American and Canadian Graded races

References

Graded stakes races in the United States
Grade 2 stakes races in the United States
Turf races in the United States
Open sprint category horse races
Recurring sporting events established in 1995
Keeneland horse races
1995 establishments in Kentucky